Udi Gal (born June 11, 1979) is an Israeli Olympic sailor, who is a sailing world championship three-time bronze medalist.

Biography
Gal is Jewish, and was born in Tel Aviv, Israel.  He started sailing at 8 years of age, and started racing at 13 years of age.  He competes with the club Hapoel Tel Aviv.  He competed with partner Gideon Kliger in two-man competitions from the outset of his career, through 2009.

The first event he won was the Youth Europeans 420, in 1996.  In 1998 he and Kliger won the European Youth Championships, and in 2001 they  finished second in the European Championship in Ireland.

In 2004 he was chosen as chair of the Israel Olympic Committee's athletes section.

He and Kliger won bronze medals in the Sailing 470 World Championship for three straight years in Men's 470-Class Two-Person Dinghy — in 2006–08.  In June 2007, he came in third in the Men's 470 ISAF Sailing World Championships, in Cascais, Portugal.  In January 2008, he came in third in the Men 470 World Championships, in Melbourne, Australia.  In April 2008, he and Kliger were ranked third in the world in the 470 class dinghy.

Gal and Kliger competed on behalf of Israel at the 2004 Summer Olympics in the Sailing at the 2004 Summer Olympics in Athens, Greece, and on behalf of Israel at the 2008 Summer Olympics in Sailing at the 2008 Summer Olympics in Beijing, China, in Men's 470-Class Two-Person Dinghy, coming in 15th and 14th, respectively.

He coaches Israeli Olympians Eyal Levin and Dan Froyliche, who are competing on behalf of Israel at the 2016 Summer Olympics, in the 470.

Gal moved to the San Francisco/Bay Area to pursue a masters degree in Sports Psychology from John F. Kennedy University, and began coaching youth sailing at Peninsula Youth Sailing Foundation (PYSF). In 2021, Gal left PYSF to start his own youth sailing program, High Performance Center (HPC) 

As a coach at the 2021 i420 world championships, he helped lead team USA to three gold medals.

References

External links
 
 

1979 births
Living people
Israeli male sailors (sport)
Olympic sailors of Israel
Sailors at the 2004 Summer Olympics – 470
Sailors at the 2008 Summer Olympics – 470
Jewish Israeli sportspeople
Reichman University alumni
Sportspeople from Tel Aviv